Bennett Smith may refer to:

 Bennett Smith (kayaker), American whitewater kayaker
 Bennett Smith (shipbuilder) (1808–1888), shipbuilder and shipowner in Nova Scotia, Canada